Vrély is a commune in the Somme department in Hauts-de-France in northern France.

Geography
The commune is situated 25 miles (40 km) southwest of Amiens, at the junction of the D34 and D329 roads.

Population

See also
Communes of the Somme department

References

Communes of Somme (department)